Castor Township is an inactive township in Madison County, in the U.S. state of Missouri.

Castor Township was established in 1818, taking its name from the Castor River.

References

Townships in Missouri
Townships in Madison County, Missouri